Malviya Nagar is a residential locality within Indore, Madhya Pradesh, India. Started by the Indore Development Authority, it boomed in population in the late 1990s.

Postal Code: 
452008

Elected Member of the Legislative Assembly: Ranjana Shah

Entertainment
Malviya Nagar is known for its popular C 21 Mall which houses more. MEGASTORE, Big Life, Satyam Cineplex etc.  There are a number of restaurants in the mall including McDonald's and Domino's.

Residential sectors 
The locality consists of six sectors from A to F in which approximately 5000 houses are being occupied the colony.

Transportation

Road

Bus
Malviya Nagar has an iBus Station connecting it to other parts of Indore City.

References

Suburbs of Indore
Neighbourhoods in Indore
Memorials to Madan Mohan Malaviya